United-Reform Coalition can refer to the following in New Zealand:
 United-Reform Coalition, agreement between the United and Reform parties
 United–Reform coalition Government of New Zealand, the government formed by the coalition